Vampire Academy is an American fantasy horror television series based on the novels series of the same name by Richelle Mead. Adapted for Peacock by Julie Plec and Marguerite MacIntyre, the series is produced by Universal Television. It stars Sisi Stringer, Daniela Nieves, Kieron Moore and André Dae Kim alongside an ensemble cast.

It is the second adaptation of the novel series, after the 2014 film of the same name, and serves as a reboot. Unlike the film, it does not adapt a particular novels of Mead's series, and instead takes the basics, inspirations and elements from the six novels, telling a different story. It was given a straight-to-series order in May 2021 by Peacock, and casting announcements were made in 2021. The filming took place in Spain and Portugal.

The series features characters from the books and re-imagined versions of others. It revolves around Rose Hathaway who is a guardian-in-training Dhampir, and Lissa Dragomir, who is a Moroi princess, and follows their life and adventures at the St Vladimir's Academy, a boarding school.

The series premiered on September 15, 2022 on Peacock to generally positive reviews. In January 2023, the series was canceled after one season.

Cast

Main
 Sisi Stringer as Rose Hathaway: a dhampir guardian-in-training; Lissa's best friend; Dimitri's love interest
 Daniela Nieves as Lissa Dragomir: a royal moroi vampire; spirit user; Dragomir princess; Andre's sister; Rose's best friend; Christian's love interest
 Kieron Moore as Dimitri Belikov: a dhampir guardian; head command; Rose's love interest
 André Dae Kim as Christian Ozera: a royal moroi vampire; fire user; Lissa's love interest
 Anita-Joy Uwajeh as Tatiana Vogel: a royal moroi vampire; member of the royal council; political underdog
 Mia McKenna-Bruce as Mia Karp: a non-royal moroi vampire; water user; Victor and Robert's adoptive daughter; Sonya's adoptive sister; Meredith's love interest
 Jonetta Kaiser as Sonya Karp: a non-royal moroi vampire-turned Strigoi; a secret spirit user; Victor and Robert's daughter, Mia's adoptive sister; Mikhail's former girlfriend
 Andrew Liner as Mason Ashford: a dhampir guardian-in-training; Stefan's son; Rose's friend and one-sided love interest
 Rhian Blundell as Meredith Beckham: a dhampir guardian-in-training; Mia's love interest
 J. August Richards as Victor Dashkov: a royal moroi vampire, member of the royal council; key advisor to the queen; Robert's husband; Sonya and Mia's father; Lissa's godfather and legal guardian

Recurring

 Pik-Sen Lim as Queen Marina: a royal moroi vampire; air user; the 200 year old queen of the Dominion
 Jason Diaz as Andre Dragomir: a royal moroi vampire; fire user; Dragomir prince; the queen's pick to be her successor; Lissa's brother
 Max Parker as Mikhail Tanner: a dhampir guardian; Kieran's son; Sasha's brother; Sonya's former boyfriend
 Jennifer Kirby as Alberta Casey: a dhampir guardian; head of the guardians
 Joseph Ollman as Jesse Zeklos: fire user; a royal moroi vampire; Dane's son
 Yael Belicha as Marie Carter: a royal moroi vampire; earth user; member of the royal council; a traditionalist and conservative
 Amanda Drew as Diane
 Angela Wynter as Irene Vogel: a royal moroi vampire; high priestess; earth user; Tatiana's great aunt
 Craig Stevenson as Dane Zeklos: a royal moroi vampire; air user; member of the royal council; Jesse's father
 Adam Quintero as Peter Tarus: a royal moroi vampire; member of the royal council
 Blake Patrick Anderson as Eddie Castile: a dhampir guardian-in-training
 Louisa Connolly-Burnham as Silver
 Cornelius Macarthy as Robert Karp: Victor's husband; Sonya and Mia's father

Episodes

Production

Development
In 2010, Preger Entertainment optioned the film rights to the Vampire Academy series by Richelle Mead. The film, based on the first book, was released theatrically in United States in February 2014 and was a box-office bomb. Following the movie failure, Preger Entertainment launched a Indiegogo campaign to help fund the production for a sequel based on the second novel, Frostbite. However, the campaign failed to reach its goal and the project was ultimately cancelled.

In March 2015, Julie Plec expressed on Twitter a desire to adapt the books into a television series. In May 2021, Peacock picked up Vampire Academy straight-to-series with Plec and Marguerite MacIntyre as developers and also expected to executive produce alongside Emily Cummins and Jillian DeFrehn, as part of Plec overall deal at Universal Television. Don Murphy, Susan Montford, and Deepak Nayar, who produced the 2014 film, also joined the series as executive producers.

On January 20, 2023, Peacock canceled the series after one season.

Casting
In August 2021, the core cast for the series was set, including Sisi Stringer as Rose Hathaway, Daniela Nieves as Lissa Dragomir, Kieron Moore as Dimitri Belikov, and André Dae Kim as Christian Ozera. J. August Richards, Jonetta Kaiser, and Andrew Liner were cast as Victor Dashkov, Sonya Karp, and Mason Ashford, respectively. Anita-Joy Uwajeh joined the cast as Tatiana Vogel, while Mia McKenna-Bruce signed for the role of Mia Karp, two re-imagined versions of characters from the books, Tatiana Ivashkov, and Mia Rinaldi. Rhian Blundell was announced to play Meredith, a minor characters in the books. In August 2022, Angela Wynter, Lorna Brown, Louisa Connolly-Burnham, Cornelius Macarthy, Jason Diaz, Jennifer Kirby, Joseph Ollman, and Pik-Sen Lim were cast in recurring capacities.

Filming
Filming had begun in Spain in locations such as Pamplona, Olite, Viana and Zaragoza in September 2021, as revealed by Bille Woodruff, who directed the pilot, and Julie Plec. The series was also filmed in Portugal.

Release
Vampire Academy premiered on Peacock on September 15, 2022.

Reception

The review aggregator website Rotten Tomatoes reported a 77% approval rating with an average rating of 7.4/10, based on 13 critic reviews. Metacritic, which uses a weighted average, assigned a score of 59 out of 100 based on 7 critics, indicating "mixed or average reviews".

References

External links
 
 

2020s American high school television series
2020s American horror television series
2020s American supernatural television series
2020s American teen drama television series
2022 American television series debuts
2022 American television series endings
American fantasy drama television series
American fantasy television series
American horror fiction television series
Boarding school fiction
Dark fantasy television series
English-language television shows
Horror drama television series
Peacock (streaming service) original programming
Television about magic
Television series about teenagers
Television series about vampires
Television series by Universal Television
Television series reboots
Television shows based on American novels
Television shows filmed in Spain
Television shows filmed in Portugal
Vampire Academy series